Prince Arthur Eze (born 27 November 1948), commonly known as Arthur Eze is a Nigerian billionare businessman, politician and philanthropist. He is the founder and CEO of Atlas Oranto Petroleum, Nigeria's largest and one of Africa's largest privately owned exploration and production company.

In 2012, Arthur Eze was profiled as one of the most generous philanthropists in Africa by Forbes.

Early life 
Arthur Eze was born into a royal family from Dunukofia, Anambra, the Southern-East of Nigeria, on 27 November 1948, his elder brother Igwe Robert Eze, is the monarch of Ukpo, a town in Dunukofia Local Government Area.

Education 
In 1970, Arthur received his secondary education from St. Augustin Secondary School in Nkwere, Imo State and California State University in Long Beach, United States for his tertiary education where he studied mechanical and chemical engineering from 1974 to 1978.

References 

Living people
1948 births
Nigerian billionaires
Nigerian businesspeople in the oil industry
Nigerian philanthropists
California State University, Long Beach alumni